Stephen Wise may refer to:

 Stephen Samuel Wise (1874–1949), American rabbi and Zionist leader
 Stephen R. Wise (born 1941), member of the Florida Senate

See also
 Steven M. Wise (born 1952), American legal scholar